The 63rd Mobil 1 12 Hours of Sebring Fueled by Fresh from Florida was an endurance sports car racing event held at Sebring International Raceway from March 18-21st. The race was the second round of the 2015 United SportsCar Championship as well as the second of four events in the North American Endurance Cup.

The race was won by Action Express Racing's No. 5 Corvette Daytona Prototype, piloted by Sébastien Bourdais, João Barbosa, and Christian Fittipaldi, finishing a full lap ahead of any else in the field. The Prototype Challenge class was won by the No. 52 entry from PR1/Mathiasen Motorsports piloted by Mike Guasch, Tom Kimber-Smith, and Andrew Palmer, securing their second consecutive victory in the season. In the GT Le Mans class, victory went to Corvette Racing's No. 3 Chevrolet Corvette C7.R driven by Antonio García, Ryan Briscoe, and Jan Magnussen. Finally, in GT Daytona, victory went to the No. 23 Porsche 911 GT America from Alex Job Racing and Team Seattle driven by Mario Farnbacher, Ian James, and Alex Riberas, though it only took the lead with roughly four minutes to go when the No. 33 Riley Motorsports Dodge Viper GT3-R suffered overheating issues.

Race result

References

12 Hours of Sebring
12 Hours of Sebring
12 Hours of Sebring
2015 United SportsCar Championship season
2015 in American motorsport